Man Khod An Sizdaham is the sixth official studio album by Iranian singer Mohsen Chavoshi.

Track listing

See also
 Rumi
 Vahshi Bafqi
 Shahriar

References

External links
 Mohsen Chavoshi Official Website

2013 albums
Mohsen Chavoshi albums